Journal Printing Company Building, also known as the Dockery Building, is a historic commercial building located at Kirksville, Adair County, Missouri. It was built in 1905, and is a rectangular, two‐story, five bay, buff brick two-part commercial block over a raised basement. It measures 40 feet by 108 feet.  The building an ornate Italianate style metal cornice and six smooth, slender shafts with Ionic order capitals supporting a brick frieze at the first floor.

It was listed on the National Register of Historic Places in 2011.

References

Commercial buildings on the National Register of Historic Places in Missouri
Commercial buildings completed in 1905
Buildings and structures in Adair County, Missouri
National Register of Historic Places in Adair County, Missouri
1905 establishments in Missouri